Sea Spoilers is a 1936 American drama mystery film directed by Frank R. Strayer and starring John Wayne.

Plot
A Coast Guardsman must rescue his kidnapped girlfriend from smugglers willing to kill in order to maintain their illegal trade in seal skins. Along the way, he has to overcome a less-than-competent superior officer and being kidnapped by the smugglers.

Cast
 John Wayne as "Bos'n" Bob Randall
 Nan Grey as Connie Dawson
 William Bakewell as Lieut. Commander Mays
 Fuzzy Knight as Hogan
 Russell Hicks as Phil Morgan
 George Irving as Commander Mays
 Lotus Long as Marie
 Harry J. Worth as Nick Austin
 Ernest Hilliard as Reggie
 George Humbert as Johnny "Hop-Scotch"
 Ethan Laidlaw as Louie
 Chester Gan as Oil
 Cy Kendall as Detective
 Harrison Greene as Fats

See also
 John Wayne filmography

References

External links

1936 films
1936 drama films
American black-and-white films
American mystery drama films
Films about the United States Coast Guard
Films directed by Frank R. Strayer
Universal Pictures films
1930s mystery drama films
1930s English-language films
1930s American films